Koptsevo is a rural locality (a village) in Posyolok Nikologory, Vyaznikovsky District, Vladimir Oblast, Russia. The population was 56 as of 2010.

Geography 
Koptsevo is located 25 km southwest of Vyazniki (the district's administrative centre) by road. Gridinskaya is the nearest rural locality.

References 

Rural localities in Vyaznikovsky District